Henry Cochrane Williamsen Gleditsch (9 November 1902 – 6 October 1942) was a Norwegian actor and theatre director.

He was born in Kristiania. In his young days he participated in skiing for SFK Lyn. He married Synnøve Tanvik in 1932.

He made his acting debut in 1923, and in 1937 he established and took charge of Trøndelag Teater in Trondheim. He had a satirical style, provoking the authorities of the Occupation of Norway by Nazi Germany. People warned him and advised him to flee to Sweden, but he did not do so.

Following skirmishes in Majavatn and sabotages in Glomfjord and Malm, conducted by the Norwegian resistance movement, martial law was declared on 6 October 1942 in and around Trondheim, in Nord-Trøndelag and in Grane. In a speech held in the main square in the city center of Trondheim, Josef Terboven declared an imminent crackdown on "those who pull the strings". Henry Gleditsch was executed as a propitiatory reprisal, near Falstad, together with newspaper editor and politician Harald Langhelle and eight other people.

References

1902 births
1942 deaths
Norwegian people of English descent
People educated at the Haagaas School
Male actors from Oslo
Norwegian male stage actors
Norwegian theatre directors
Norwegian resistance members
Norwegian civilians killed in World War II
People executed by Nazi Germany by firing squad
Norwegian people executed by Nazi Germany
20th-century Norwegian male actors